Martello Court is a residential building and one of the tallest buildings in Edinburgh, Scotland. It is on Pennywell Gardens in Muirhouse, in the north-west of the city. 

It was known as the Terror Tower in the 1970s and 1980s because of the crime around it.

See also
List of tallest buildings and structures in Edinburgh

References

Buildings and structures in Edinburgh
Residential buildings in Scotland
Residential buildings completed in 1967